Belan Wali Bahu is an Indian comedy television series that aired on Colors TV from 15 January to 22 June 2018.

Plot
Roopa is a clumsy but soft-hearted housewife who tries her best to impress everyone one way or another but ends up doing some mistake or another. One day by mistake, she ends up killing her husband, Amarnath Awasthi, with her rolling pin. Roopa wins everyone's hearts as she, along with her dead husband (who is in the form of a ghost) helps the family to get out of tricky situations. The show throws light on how the role of the average housewife is hugely undermined in an Indian household.

Cast

Main
 Krystle D'Souza as Roopa Awasthi (Amarnath's wife)
 Dheeraj Sarna as Amarnath "Laddu" Awasthi (Ghost) (Roopa's husband)

Recurring
 Sudhir Pandey as Rajnath Awasthi, Amarnath's grandfather, he has a crush on Suzie, his nurse much to dismay to all.
 Mushtaq Khan as Premnath Awasthi, Amarnath's father, he is the work-free drunkard
 Bhavana Balsavar as Premlata Awasthi, Amarnath's mother, she has a loud voice and is short tempered
 Sikandar Kharbanda as Jeetendra "Jeetu" Awasthi, Amarnath's brother, Suspended Police Officer, Shalini's husband.
 Sunayana Fozdar as Shalini Awasthi, Jitendra's wife, she claims to see ghost as an excuse to refuse household work
 Parijat Atreja as Narendranath Awasthi, Amarnath's brother, a lover boy
 Shraddha Jaiswal as Suzie, Rajnath's nurse
 Manishaa Purohit as Katori, Awasthi's neighbour, who always sneaks in Awasthi house to borrow Sugar and loves eavesdropping.
 Khushboo Shroff as Dolly Sharma. Jimmy's wife. Premnath and Premlata's daughter. Laddu, Jitendranath, Narendranath's sister.
 Krunal Pandit as Jimmy Sharma, Awasthi's son-in-law, he borrows money from Awasthi and making them work for his businesses.

Special appearances
 Manish Goplani as Lallan, the thief. Roopa's childhood friend.
 Rajesh Kumar as Mahesh, Amarnath's childhood friend, his is also dead. His wife is a ghost-buster.
 Paresh Ganatra as Bobby:The dancer, Amarnath's friend. He taught the ladies of Awasthi house dance on Roopa's insistence to fulfill Amarnath's one of his last wishes. He later fell in love with Roopa but he fled away.
 Meena Naithani as Kamini. Professional maid who later revealed to be fraud.

Episodes

Awards

See also
 List of Hindi comedy shows

References

External links
Belan Wali Bahu on Voot

Hindi comedy shows
Hindi language television sitcoms
Colors TV original programming
Indian comedy television series
2018 Indian television series debuts
Indian television sitcoms
Ghosts in television
2018 Indian television series endings